Leslie Mouton (born 1965) is a television news anchor and public speaker.

Mouton was the co-anchor of Good Morning San Antonio between 4:30 a.m-7:00 a.m. for KSAT-TV news, the ABC affiliate in San Antonio, Texas. She has been a broadcast journalist since 1988 and has worked at KSAT since 1999.  
 
In October 2000, at the age of 35, Mouton was discovered with a very aggressive form of breast cancer. She allowed cameras to follow her during the entire treatment process which included surgery, chemotherapy and radiation therapy.

To bring awareness to the disease and offer encouragement and support to other women suffering from it, Mouton anchored a newscast without her wig on in order to reveal the hair loss that had resulted from the treatment process. The resulting attention landed Mouton on Good Morning America, Weekend Today, and Oprah. Newspapers worldwide as well as television programs Inside Edition and Primetime featured stories about her struggle.

Mouton continues to speak publicly about her disease in an effort to educate women about the importance of self-exams and early detection.

Her story is included in the book The Breast Cancer Book of Strength and Courage which features individual chapters written by survivors. The book's proceeds go to education and research for breast cancer. A PBS documentary on the book features Mouton and her family.

Mouton resigned from KSAT in June 2020, and in January 2021 joined Morgan's Wonderland Inclusion Foundation, a nonprofit organization designed to create equitable opportunities for people with disabilities.

Awards
The Congressional Action for Cancer Awareness Award,
Macy's Heart and Soul Award,
Headliner Award,
Women in Communication Media Award, American Cancer Society Media Award,
Jaycee's Award for One of the 10 Most Outstanding Young Texans.

Personal life
Mouton is married to retired Air Force pilot Major Tony Mattox.  They have one daughter, Nicole Danielle Mattox.

References

External links
 KSAT Official Web Site

American television journalists
People from San Antonio
Living people
1965 births
Journalists from Texas